The National Multicultural Western Heritage Museum, formerly the National Cowboys of Color Museum and Hall of Fame, is a museum and hall of fame in Fort Worth, Texas.

History 
The National Multicultural Western Heritage Museum was founded February 1, 2001, by Jim and Gloria Austin of Fort Worth, Texas. Their objective was to recognize the individual contributions of many groups from the Western Frontier. Included in these groups are peoples Hispanic, Native American, European, Asian, and African descent. Many of these people have stories that only this organization will tell. The organization was renamed to its present name in 2008 to better encompass the varied history of the museum.

About the museum 
The museum is located at 2029 N Main Street, Fort Worth, Texas 76164. The museum resides in the Fort Worth Stockyards National Historic District. Besides the Hall of Fame, there are also permanent exhibits, such as the Buffalo Soldiers, Tuskegee Airmen, Native American Indian Chiefs, and the Vaquero.

Hall of Fame Inductees 

2019
 Valeria Vason Cunningham
 Lu Vason
 Double R Rodeo Livestock Company - C K Reid
 Taylor Hall Jr., aka "Bailey's Prairie Kid
Wes Studi
James Pickens Jr.
 Michael Aku Ro Driguez
Source:

2018
 Douglas Harmon, Ph.D.
 Will Arthur "Artie" Morris
 Jay Novacek
 Eugene "Gene" Smith*
 James Watson Jr.
 Libby Willis
Dale Evans (posthumous induction)
Roy Rogers (posthumous induction)
 John Ware (posthumous induction)
 Charley Willis (posthumous induction)
Source:

2017 Inductees
 Billy and Pam Minick
Bob Tallman
 Fort Worth Herd
 Scott Murray
 Wilbert D. "Wil" Robinson - Posthumous Inductee
 William J. Grandstaff - Posthumous Inductee

2016 Inductees
 Cleveland Walters
 Floyd Frank
 Hub Baker
 Isador "Lolo" Munoz
 James Beckwourth
 Timmy Brooks

2015 Inductees
 Danell Tipton
 Gordon Wade Tonips
 Harvey Means
 Holt Hickman
Jamie Foxx
 Judge Paul L. Brady
 Randy White
 Steve Murrin
 Walt Garrison

2014 Inductees
Anne Lockhart
Barry Corbin
 Nathan Jean Whitaker Sanders aka "Mama Sugar"
 Vincent Jacobs

2013 Inductees
 Monroe Tahmahkera (Posthumous)

2012-2013 Inductees
 Burl Washington, Texas
 Colonel Allen Allensworth*, California (Posthumous
 Floyd "Buck" Wyatt*, Oklahoma (Posthumously)
Fred Whitfield, Texas
 James Butler Hickok (Posthumously)
 Lawrence Homer Coffee, Texas
 Mollie Taylor Stevenson Jr., Texas
Pam Grier, Colorado
 Walt Willey, Illinois
 Woody Strode*, California (Posthumously)

2011 Inductees
 Freddie "Skeet" Gordon
 Glynn Turman
 Joe Beaver
 Peter Perkins Pitchlynn
Ruth Scantlin Roach
 Shirlie Sanders
 Walter Clarence "Buck" Taylor
 William "Will" Penn Adair Rogers

2010 Inductees
 Abe Morris
 Charles Hank Banks
 Harold Cash
 Lowell "Stretch" Smith
 Paul J. Matthews
 Robert Strauss

2009 Inductees
 Albino Tais (Posthumous)
 Alex Dees
 Ben F. Tahmahkera
 Calvin Norris Greely Jr. (Posthumous)
 Dean Smith
 Henry Harris (Posthumous)
 Isaac Burns Murphy (Posthumous)
Mayisha Akbar

2008 Inductees
 Art T. Burton
 Holt Collier
 Matthew 'Bones' Hooks
 Paul Cleveland
 Taylor H. Haynes, M.D.
 Tommie Haw
 Willie Thomas

2007 Inductees
 Cathay Williams
 Frank White
 Nathaniel 'Rex' Purefoy
Red Steagall
 Rufus Green Sr.
Tom Three Persons
 Verna Lee Booker Hightower

2006 Inductees
Bass Reeves*
Charley Pride
 Colonel Juan Seguin*
 George Fletcher
Jackson Sundown
 Ken Pollard
 Knox Simmons
 Patricia E. Kelly
 Rosieleetta Lee Reed

2005 Inductees
 Ed 'Pop' Landers
 Gerardo 'Jerry' Diaz
 Luke 'Leon' Coffee
 Melvin 'Mel' Carnell Blount
Vicki Herrera Adams

2004 Inductees
 Jim Lane
 Mantan Moreland
 Mary Fields
 Walter Charles Morse

2003 Inductees
Bill Pickett
 Bose Ikard
 Charles Sampson
 Herb Jeffries
 Jose 'Pepe' Diaz
Myrtis Dightman
Quanah Parker
 Steven R. Heape

Source:

See also
 List of museums in North Texas

Notes

External links
Official Website

Cowboy halls of fame
Western
Ethnic museums in Texas
American West museums in Texas
Museums in Fort Worth, Texas
Museums established in 2001
2001 establishments in Texas
Awards established in 2001